The Broken News is a 2022 Indian Hindi-language web-series directed by Vinay Waikul on ZEE5 starring Jaideep Ahlawat, Sonali Bendre, Shriya Pilgaonkar, Jay Upadhyay, Indraneil Sengupta, Taaruk Raina, Aakash Khurana and Kiran Kumar. It is a remake of the British series Press. It is written by Mike Bartlett, who created the original, and Sambit Mishra. 

The series released on 10 June 2022 on ZEE5.

Plot 
The Broken News depicts the rivalry between two Indian news channels based in Mumbai - 'Awaaz Bharati' and 'Josh 24/7'. It reveals the lives, lies, loves and struggles of a dynamic group of journalists. Awaaz Bharati a news outlet headed by Amina Qureshi, an extremely credible editor who believes in ethics of journalism. But channel is perennially cash-strapped and bleeding. Josh 24/7, headed by Dipankar Sanyal is India's no.1 channel, according to TRPs but is sensationalist, and doesn't always bother to check its facts. The only things that matter to Josh 24/7  are eyeballs and viewership, hence they have power and are minting money. Between these two extremes is Radha Bhargava. The show reveals all their lives as they attempt to balance work and leisure, ambition and integrity, amid the never-ending pressure of the news cycle and an industry trying to be one step ahead yet facing an uncertain future.

Cast 
 Jaideep Ahlawat as Dipankar Sanyal, head of Josh 24x7
 Sonali Bendre as Ameena Qureshi, Radha's boss and head of Awaaz Bharati
 Shriya Pilgaonkar as Radha Bhargava
 Indraneil Sengupta as Pankaj Awasthi
 Taaruk Raina as Anuj Saxena, a journalist at Josh 24x7
 Aakash Khurana as Ketan Kedia
 Kiran Kumar as Radhe Shyam Bansal
 Sanjeeta Bhattacharya as Juhi Shergill, a journalist at Awaaz Bharati
 Mugdha Godse as Gulnaaz Khan
 Faisal Rashid as Kamal Wadia, a journalist at Awaaz Bharati
 Jay Upadhyay as Praful Gupta
 Jaywant Wadkar as Bhau
 Sukhmani Sadana as Arunima Sanyal
 Shreya Mehta as Lisa
 Mohan Kapur as Anurag Bhatia
 Sharad Kapoor as Akhil Kapoor
 Deepali Pansare as Nazneen Balsara

Reception 
Rashmi Vasudeva from Deccan Herald wrote "'The Broken News' review: Newsroom drama made entertaining". Johnson Thomas from Filmibeat wrote "Sonali Bendre, Shriya Pilgaonkar & Jaideep Ahlawat In Top Form". Saibal Chatterjee from NDTV stated "Sonali Bendre Brings Remarkable Maturity, Jaideep Ahlawat Is In Splendid Form ". Shubhra Gupta from Indian Express wrote "Sonali Bendre, Jaideep Ahlawat show is more of a crime thriller than a cautionary tale". Chirag Shehgal from News18 states "Jaideep Alhawat is as Brilliant as Ever, Sonali Bendre Deserved More Screen Time". Namrata Thakker from Rediff wrote "With solid actors headlining the cast and supporting actors lending good support, The Broken News is a good weekend binge watch".

References

External links 
 
 The Broken News on ZEE5

2022 Indian television series debuts
Indian television series
Television shows set in India